

This is a list of the National Register of Historic Places listings in Pawtucket, Rhode Island.

This is intended to be a complete list of the properties and districts on the National Register of Historic Places in Pawtucket, Rhode Island, United States. Latitude and longitude coordinates are provided for many National Register properties and districts; these locations may be seen together in an online map.

There are 434 properties and districts listed on the National Register in Providence County, including 15 National Historic Landmarks. The city of Pawtucket is the location of 57 these properties and districts, including 1 National Historic Landmark; they are listed here. Properties and districts located in the county's other municipalities are listed separately. Two Pawtucket listings, the Blackstone Canal and the Conant Thread-Coats & Clark Mill Complex District, extend into other parts of Providence County, and appear on multiple lists.

Current listings

|}

See also

List of National Historic Landmarks in Rhode Island
National Register of Historic Places listings in Rhode Island

References

 01
.N
.
Pawtucket
Pawtucket, Rhode Island
N